Kang Seung-yoon (Korean: 강승윤; born ), also known mononymously as Seungyoon or Yoon, is a South Korean singer-songwriter, actor, and leader of boy band Winner. His appearance on the reality television singing contest Superstar K2 (2010) rose him to prominence after finishing in fourth place. The digital single "Instinctively", became his first number-one single as a soloist and neared 2 million digital copies in sales. On January 12, 2011 he signed with South Korean label YG Entertainment and officially debuted as a solo artist on July 16, 2013 with the digital single "It Rains" (비가 온다) and as the leader of Winner on August 17, 2014.

Kang ventured into acting through the sitcom, High Kick: Revenge of the Short Legged (2011). His first lead role with the web series, We Broke Up (2015) earned his first award in the field with "Best Male Actor" awarded by the K-web Fest Awards. His roles in Prison Playbook (2017) and Kairos (2020) further solidified his career as an actor. Kang also served as the "122nd Masked King" on MBC's King of Mask Singer under the alias "Chow Yun-fat". He achieved a record-breaking six consecutive wins, earning him the titles: "The First 6-Time Idol Champion" and "The Youngest Champion" at the time.

Life and career

1994–2009: Early life 
Kang Seung-yoon was born in Haeundae District, Busan, South Korea, on January 21, 1994, as a Catholic with the baptismal name Don Bosco and as an only child. Raised by his single mother, his parents divorced within the early portion of his childhood and was no longer in contact with his father who chose to depart from their lives until news of his death was relayed long after his passing. His mother owned a business but suffered financially from balancing out the accumulated debt. It resulted in her entire profits being allocated towards the debt and so, was in need to borrow more money for additional costs which in turn, resulted in both further liabilities and a bad credit rating and brought more hardship.

In school, he excelled in mathematics with an IQ of 141; however, in his second year of middle school, he became a victim of bullying by those he considered "friends" and dropped out of middle school after he developed social anxiety. In this period of time, he learned to play the classical guitar from an academy and briefly took classes for billiards where he encountered a man 5–6 years older than him who later helped with his anxiety. He then decided to pursue a career as a classical guitarist juxtaposed to his choices as a child which included to delve into politics, become a scientist, a comic book writer or a billiards player – which he became the eventual regional youth representative of and actively played until first year of high school. He took the GED examination for middle school and enrolled at Busan High School of Arts with a major in classic guitar but later considered to be a singer. Kang graduated in 2012.

2010–2013: Commercial success and solo debut 

17-year-old Kang (Korean age) attended the regional preliminary audition for Superstar K2 (2010). Initially reluctant due to conflict in perception of using mass media to gain fame opposed to becoming successful without it, he yielded at his friend's request when asked to audition with him, and so, took guitar lessons to further hone his skills three months prior to it. Kang passed the preliminaries with "This Time" by Jonathan Rhys Meyers and overall placed fourth behind Huh Gak, John Park and Jang Jae-in amongst over 1,350,000 applicants. His rendition of "Instinctively" (본능적으로; bonneungjeog-eulo) by Yoon Jong-shin in his last stage received praise by both judges and audience alike. Its digital release led Kang to his first number-one single as a solo artist and neared 2 million digital copies in sales. Its success won him, "Rookie of the Year" at the Gaon Chart Awards and "Rookie of the Month (October)" at the Cyworld Digital Music Awards. CEO Yang Hyun-suk of YG Entertainment and Psy invited Kang to a meeting to propose an offer to join them under a trainee status. Kang signed with them on January 12, 2011 and began training on March 9. He explained: "Since Superstar K2 ended, there were a lot of offers. Some said they would make me a star of Asia, and some offered a great amount of money for a contract. I chose YG Entertainment because this agency evaluated me objectively, unlike others I was viewed as an actual trainee." 

In the midst of his trainee period, Kang participated as the fourth artist to release the original soundtrack for Midas (2011). "You Are Heaven" (니가 천국이다; niga cheongug-ida) topped both real-time and daily South Korean music streaming platforms, which include Genie, and peaked at number 11 on the Gaon Digital Chart. That same year, he received an offer to audition for High Kick: Revenge of the Short Legged (2011), which hundreds of individuals lined up for. With no prior experience in acting, Kang auditioned in his Busan dialect and later met with the writers. Although they did not have a place for him amongst the current roles, a new role was specifically curated for him in spurt of the moment. Kang starred alongside Lee Jong-suk and Krystal Jung. In correlation to its soundtrack he collaborated with Lee Juck on "Smile, My Love" (웃어라 그대; useola geudae) which entered the Gaon Digital Chart at number 79. The third installation of the "High Kick" series aired from September 19, 2011, to March 29, 2012. 

On June 20, 2013, Yang Hyun-suk announced 19-year-old Kang would debut as a solo artist with the digital single, "Wild and Young", composed by Teddy Park. On July 15, it was revealed to be postponed and instead the next day another digital single in the format of a pre-release entitled "It Rains" (비가 온다; biga onda) was released. The single achieved an "all-kill" which placed number-one on all music streaming platforms in South Korea, including Melon and Mnet, and debuted at number two on the Gaon Digital Chart. His second digital single, "Wild and Young" was released on July 31, with the accompaniment of a music video and appeared on the Gaon Digital Chart at number 18. Live promotions for the single commenced on August 4 from Inkigayo. Kang released his third digital single "Stealer" (맘도둑; mamdodug) ten days later with his second music video which starred rookie actress Yoon Jin-yi. Promotions were not carried out to prevent disruption in promotion of "Wild and Young". "Stealer" debuted at thirteenth on the Gaon Digital Chart.

2014–2019: Debut with Winner and acting projects 

In the Mnet survival reality broadcast WIN: Who Is Next (2013) Kang participated as a contestant. The program involved two assembles consisting of male trainees under YG Entertainment (A and B) that would compete for the chance to debut by the end of the series after embarking on a 100 day journey. Kang was allocated in "Team A" with Kim Jin-woo, Lee Seung-hoon, Song Min-ho and Nam Tae-hyun in accordance to the label. In the seventh episode of the television broadcast, he temporarily replaced Song as its leader, after he sustained an ankle injury. He became its eventual permanent leader through the appointment of Yang Hyun-suk, ensuing he witnessed growth. On October 25, "Team A" were revealed as victors of the series and would subsequently begin preparations and debut as Winner. Kang made his official debut with the five-piece band, Winner, on August 17, 2014. The band's success upon debut was recorded as "unprecedented" by media outlets, having made their mark in the industry that early on in its career. Kang also participated in Superstar K2 judge panelist Yoon Jong-shin's Monthly project with Song for the digital single, "Wild Boy".

The singer-turned-thespian returned to acting since his last project High Kick: Revenge of the Short Legged (2011),  with the web drama We Broke Up (2015). He starred as its male lead with label-mate Sandara Park as his counterpart. The series was aired from June 29, 2015 to July 17 via Naver TV and found success by becoming the fourth most watched web drama on the platform within that year with 11.45 million views and 16 million views collectively as of October 2015. The series were invited to the Geneva International Film Festival in Switzerland, a first amongst all Korean web dramas. Its positive receptions led the main cast to hold a surprise "mini-concert" in Seoul with exclusivity to 200 attendees. His performance in the series accredited to his award for "Best Male Actor" by the K Web Fest Awards. For his second web drama, he starred in Love for a Thousand More (2016) as its male lead and opposite to actress Hwang Seung-eon. The series included band-mate, Kim Jin-woo, and is a joint production of CJ E&M, YG Entertainment, and YG KPlus. While it did not reach the same level of popularity as his prior project, the series exceeded 5 million views as of December 2016 and was cited a success. Kang released a soundtrack for the drama, titled "You" (너; neo) and served as its only release. 

In continuation of his acting career, he starred in Prison Playbook (2017–2018). He was cast with a supporting role through an audition in which required him to read a portion from the script using his regional dialect on the spot. Shin Won-ho — the director of the television series — revealed while he initially did not have high expectations as it had been long since he was seen in 'High Kick', he found his portrayal fun and believed he brought the character to life. Shin elaborated: " [...] my generation doesn't really know him as a Winner [member] [...] I didn't have any bias because of the group he was in, he just fit well with us." The series also served as an on-screen reunion for he and Krystal since five years and six months in High Kick: Revenge of the Short Legged (2011–2012). Kang and band-mate Mino released its soundtrack titled "Door" (문; mun). In 2018, he lent his voice for the Korean film Golden Slumber (2018) and its eponymous soundtrack originally by The Beatles. Paul McCartney received $200,000 for its usage, highest for a Korean production.

2020–present: King of Mask Singer and first full-length album 

In March 2020, Kang was invited by the MBC singing competition program, King of Mask Singer, for the second time and subsequently won, earning the title as the "122nd Mask King" during his appearance as "Chow Yun-fat" after defeating South Korean singer, So Chan-whee. He pulled off six consecutive wins and was named "The First 6-Time Idol Champion" and “The Youngest Champion” at the time. "Chow Yun-fat" was credited for its rise in viewership ratings in which recorded 10% since his first stage. His appearance maintained double digits in rating which placed the show on top within its time slot for five consecutive weeks. Kang's performances placed number-one and two respectively every week on the Naver TV Top 100 Popular Video Chart while his alias topped real-time on search portal site Naver in the entirety of his reign of 14 weeks hence created a buzz. 

Kang returned as an actor after three years since Prison Playbook (2017–2018) with Kairos (2020). He joined its main cast as "Im Gun-wook", and was often filmed with Lee Se-young and Lee Joo-myung. His persona earned a nomination at the 2020 MBC Drama Awards for "Best New Actor". He joined the fourth season of Voice (2021), a thriller-procedural series, and acted as "Han Woo-joo", the 4D patrol officer that was specially recruited in the cyber team. In request by the series', he sang the soundtracks "Can You Hear Me" and "Your Voice" for both aforementioned projects.

Kang released his first full-length album on March 29, 2021 — ten years into his career as a musician — entitled Page and its lead single "Iyah" (아이야; aiya). The album debuted at number three on the Gaon Album Chart and sold 122,202 copies in South Korea as of April 2021. The titular amassed 10 million views within the second week of its release on YouTube. In conjunction of it, Kang held his first-ever solo concert titled "Passage" on November 21, 2021. The event were simultaneously held in-person at Olympic Hall in Seoul and online as an integral of "YG Palm Stage 2021" while adhering COVID-19 guidelines and limits. On March 14, 2022, he released his fourth digital single "Born to Love You" and its music video. 

Since King of Mask Singer, KBS2 singing competition program, Immortal Songs: Singing the Legend, had sought for Kang to appear on the show; however, he declined their invitations due to his unavailability, until he was requested to compete on the "Lee Juck Special" to which he accepted with Lee personally scouting its participants. Kang performed "Rain" by Lee Juck in its latter half and was crowned the winner against veteran artists Forte di Quattro, Kwak Jin-eon, Choi Jung-in, and Jung Dong-ha. His title as the winner earned him the privilege to compete in the show's "King of Kings Special" and performed "Around 30" (서른 즈음에; seoleun jeueum-e) by Kim Kwang-seok, while competing with a flu against singers Lee Eun-mi and Seodo Band, Lee Young-hyun and Park Min-hye of Big Mama, La Poem and Forestella in its second part of the special. It recorded a rating of 7.7% nationwide and 8.0% in the metropolitan area in July 2022 — ranking first among all entertainment programs on Saturdays and it's time slot.

Personal life 
On June 2, 2019, while he carried out promotions with his band for the lead single, "Ah Yeah" (아예; aye), Kang experienced symptoms of a spinal disc herniation while stand-by for rehearsals at Inkigayo. He was transported to the emergency room in a nearby hospital for examination and received treatment for the said diagnosis. He was discharged three days later after completing his treatment and was instructed to rest; however, Kang chose to carry out scheduled activities to minimize any burden inflicted on his band in result of his absence.

Artistry

Musicality and songwriting 

Kang has since been a registered associate member of the Korea Music Copyright Association and was one of twenty-five with band-mate Mino, to be promoted to the status of "full member" in January 2021. The requirements for the promotion include to maintain an associate membership for three years or more, receive a "certain amount" in royalties from copyrighted property each year, and also be selected by the board of directors. They are also given the right to vote at their general meetings.

Kang revealed he was born with weak vocal cords and when not kept in check, he can entirely lose his voice for a whole week. His ENT doctor however, cited he does well in producing sounds with his condition in such that does not hurt nor affect him.

Influence 
In photography, Kang cited Henri Cartier-Bresson as his main inspiration towards the art and so refers to him as the "master of black and white photography", his favorite medium.

Public image 
Kang became known and rose to prominence at age 16 after he competed in Superstar K2. He is often identified for his powerful baritone voice and usage of guitar and so he was often dubbed as a "rocker kid".

Within South Korea, Rubin of 1Team stated Kang as his role model and inspiration towards music from the day he viewed his performance of "Black or White" by Michael Jackson on Superstar K2 in the midst of travelling to an academy. Changbin of Stray Kids cited him as an inspiration since his appearance on an audition program and also desired to work on an "emotional hip hop" single with him. South Korean veteran actress, Kim Hee-sun, also cited herself as a fan of both Kang's voice and his band.

Other ventures

Endorsements and photography 

Since 2010, Kang appeared as an endorsement model for LG U+ and its International Call 002 range, CJ Group and the new corporate campaign in six years, "Different ideas that change the world", with Superstar K2 contestants Huh Gak, John Park, Jang Jae-in and YG Family artists Big Bang, 2NE1 and Psy, and also for the Samsung Galaxy Tab. In the years after, he endorsed Grand Chase of KOG Studios, Team Polham of Asian Fashion, Fanta with Lee Kwang-soo and Baek Jin-hee, Yogiyo with label-mates Cha Seung-won, Choi Ji-woo, Yoo In-na and AKMU. as well as J.One Cosmetics.

Under the alias "Yooyeon" — a persona exclusive to photography that translates to "flexible" from Korean in correlation to his mindset — 27-year-old Kang first exhibited his work at the Saatchi Gallery located in West London as part of StART, an international contemporary art fair. He showcased black and white photographs taken amidst various trips.

In March 2023, it was announced that Kang would be holding his first solo photography exhibition, Sky Roof, which would run from March 23 to April 19.

Philanthropy 
In the midst of the "Ice Bucket Challenge" — initiated by senior label-mate Sean of Jinusean within South Korea in 2018 — Sean disclosed in addition to Kang's earlier participation and donation, he quietly donated an extra ₩30 million to the Seungil Hope Foundation.

Following the cancellation of contemporary casual clothing brand PLAC's 'by YOU' collection in collaboration with Seungyoon and bandmate Mino showcase event, scheduled on February 28, 2020, due to safety issues in relation to the recent coronavirus pandemic, the funds they raised towards the showcase was used to donate 10,000 masks for low-income children.

In December 2021, Kang participated in a recording of an audio guide for an exhibition at the Korea National Maritime Museum in Busan entitled "Wonderworld Maps: Connecting Longingness Beyond the Horizon." It was created to help individuals with vision impairment enjoy the exhibition while listening to the explanations of each piece. Kang donated the entire earning he received from recording the audio guide to fund the education of children whose families are part of the Siloam Center for the Blind.

On August 11, 2022, Kang donated  to help those affected by the 2022 South Korean floods through the Hope Bridge Korea Disaster Relief Association.

Ambassadorship

Discography

Studio albums

Singles

Promotional singles

Collaborations

Other charted songs

Soundtrack appearances

Production credits 
All song credits are adapted from the Korea Music Copyright Association's database, unless otherwise noted.

Solo work

Work as Winner

Other artists

Videography

Music videos

Filmography

Television series

Web series

Television shows

Web shows

Radio shows

Concerts and tours

Concerts

Awards and nominations

Notes

References

External links 

 

1994 births
K-pop singers
Living people
South Korean male singers
South Korean pop singers
South Korean Roman Catholics
South Korean male television actors
South Korean male web series actors
YG Entertainment artists
Superstar K participants
Winner (band) members
21st-century South Korean singers
South Korean male idols